Estádio do Maxaquene is a multi-purpose stadium in Maputo, Mozambique.  It is currently used mostly for football matches and is the home stadium of Clube de Desportos do Maxaquene.  The stadium holds 15,000 people.  

Maxaquene
Multi-purpose stadiums in Mozambique
Buildings and structures in Maputo
Sport in Maputo
C.D. Maxaquene